Coenogonium pineti is a species of crustose lichen in the family Coenogoniaceae. It was first formally described by Erik Acharius in 1810, as Lecidea pineti. Robert Lücking and H. Thorsten Lumbsch transferred it to Coenogonium in 2004 after molecular phylogenetic analysis suggested its placement in that genus. The lichen has a widespread distribution in cooler, temperate regions of the Northern Hemisphere, but has also been recorded from southeastern mainland Australia and Tasmania.

Although usually found growing on bark, Coenogonium pineti has also been found growing on mosses. Its thallus is smooth, greyish-green to greenish-black in colour, and lacks a prothallus; it measures  in diameter. The apothecia are small (0.2–0.5 mm in diameter) and pale with a wide margin. Ascospores are ellipsoid with a single septum, measuring 9–14 by 2.3–4.5 μm.

References

Gyalectales
Lichen species
Lichens described in 1810
Lichens of Asia
Lichens of Australia
Lichens of Europe
Lichens of North America
Taxa named by Erik Acharius